Saül is a commune of French Guiana.

Saül may also refer to:

 Saül (opera), a 2003 opera by Flavio Testi
 Saül, a 1903 play by André Gide